Diabetes usually refers to diabetes mellitus, a group of metabolic diseases in which a person has high blood glucose levels over a prolonged period.

Diabetes may also refer to a heterogeneous group of diseases that only have in common excessive urination and thirst:

Diabetic conditions

Diabetes insipidus
 Diabetes insipidus (DI), a condition characterized by excessive thirst and excretion of large amounts of severely diluted urine (unrelated to the high blood sugar levels of diabetes mellitus)
 Nephrogenic diabetes insipidus, a form of diabetes insipidus due primarily to pathology of the kidney (genetic defect in ability of kidney to concentrate urine)
 Neurogenic diabetes insipidus, a lack of vasopressin (ADH) production in the hypothalamus of the brain

Diabetes mellitus

Types of diabetes mellitus

Common types
 Diabetes mellitus type 1, a form of diabetes mellitus that results from autoimmune destruction of insulin-producing beta cells of the pancreas
 Diabetes mellitus type 2, a metabolic disorder that is characterized by high blood glucose in the context of insulin resistance and relative insulin deficiency
 Diabetes mellitus type 3, a proposed term by researchers for describing the link between Alzheimer's disease and Diabetes.
 Diabetes mellitus type 4, a proposed term to describe specific kinds of metabolic disorders involving long-term high bloodpressure
 Gestational diabetes, a condition in which women without previously diagnosed diabetes exhibit high blood glucose levels during pregnancy. Sometimes referred to as Type 4 Diabetes.
 Diabetes mellitus and pregnancy
 Diabetes mellitus type 5, a proposed term to describe the link between Parkinson's disease and diabetes.

Rare types
 Diabetes mellitus and deafness, a mitochondrial disease associated with the gene "Leu-UUR"
 Latent autoimmune diabetes (LADA), a term coined to describe slow-onset type 1 autoimmune diabetes in adults
 Lipoatrophic diabetes, a type of diabetes mellitus presenting with severe lipodystrophy
 Maturity onset diabetes of the young (MODY), any of several genetic forms of diabetes caused by mutations in an autosomal dominant gene that disrupts insulin production or action
 Neonatal diabetes mellitus, a form of diabetes that occurs in the first 6 months of life
 Permanent neonatal diabetes mellitus
 Transient neonatal diabetes mellitus
 Prediabetes, a state of elevated blood sugar that falls below the thresholds for diagnosis of diabetes mellitus 
 Steroid-induced diabetes, prolonged high blood sugar due to glucocorticoid therapy for another medical condition

Complications of diabetes mellitus

Acute
 Diabetic coma, a reversible form of coma, a medical emergency, found in people with diabetes mellitus with a extremely elevated blood sugar 
 Diabetic ketoacidosis, a potentially life-threatening complication in patients with diabetes mellitus (usually type 1)

Chronic
 Diabetic foot, refers to several podiatric pathologies associated with diabetes mellitus
 Diabetic nephropathy, damage to the kidneys and the development of proteinuria and chronic kidney disease
 Diabetic neuropathy, a disorder that is associated with diabetes mellitus
 Diabetic retinopathy, damage to the retina of the eye caused by complications of diabetes mellitus, which can eventually lead to diabetic nephropathy, damage to the kidneys and the development of proteinuria, and chronic kidney disease

Diabetes in animals
 Diabetes in cats
 Diabetes in dogs
 Diabetes in horses

Diabetes management
 Diabetes management, a system to monitor and maintain the impaired glucose cycle that results from diabetes
 Anti-diabetic medication
 Diabetes management software, runs on personal computers and personal digital assistants (PDAs) to help persons with Type 1 and Type 2 diabetes manage their disease
 Diabetic diet
 Insulin therapy

Periodicals
 Diabetes (journal), a peer-reviewed scientific journal published since 1952 by the American Diabetes Association
 Diabetes Care, a peer-reviewed medical journal published since 1978 by the American Diabetes Association

See also
 Glossary of diabetes
 Diabetic hypoglycemia
 World Diabetes Day